refers to the greater palace or outer palace precincts of a Japanese palace.  In particular, it usually refers to these regions of:
 Heijō Palace in present-day Nara
 Heian Palace in present-day Kyoto